The 2011 Campeonato da Primera Divisåo de Profissionais - Módulo I , better known as the 2011 Campeonato Mineiro, was the 97th season of Minas Gerais's top-flight football league. The season began on January 29 and ended on May 15.

Format
The first stage was a single round robin. The best four teams qualified for the playoffs. If two teams have the same number of goals the team with the better first stage performance advanced. The bottom two teams were relegated.

Qualifications
The best two teams not qualified to 2012 Copa Libertadores qualified for 2012 Copa do Brasil. The best two team not playing in Campeonato Brasileiro Série A (América Mineiro, Atlético Mineiro, Cruzeiro), B or C (Ipatinga FC) qualified for 2011 Campeonato Brasileiro Série D.

Teams

First stage

Results

Playoffs

Overall table

References

2011
Min